Lise Christensen is a road cyclist from Denmark. She represented her nation at the 2004, 2005 and 2006 UCI Road World Championships.

References

External links
 profile at Procyclingstats.com

Danish female cyclists
Living people
Place of birth missing (living people)
Year of birth missing (living people)
21st-century Danish women